The 2017 Speedway European Championship season was the fifth season of the Speedway European Championship (SEC) era, and the 17th UEM Individual Speedway European Championship. It was the fifth series under the promotion of One Sport Lts. of Poland.

The championship was won by Andžejs Ļebedevs, who claimed the title for the first time. Despite not winning a round, he finished in second place three times, leaving him seven points clear of Russia's Artem Laguta in the final standings. Last year's runner-up Václav Milík finished third, while Krzysztof Kasprzak and Andreas Jonsson secured the final spots in the 2018 line-up by finishing forth and fifth respectively.

Qualification 
For the 2017 season, 15 permanent riders were joined at each SEC Final by one wild card and two track reserves.

Defending champion, Nicki Pedersen from Denmark was automatically invited to participate in all final events. Václav Milík, Krzysztof Kasprzak, Grigory Laguta and Leon Madsen secured their participation in all final events thanks to being in the top five of the general classification in the 2016 season.

Seven riders qualified through the SEC Challenge and the line-up was then completed when Artem Laguta, Andreas Jonsson and Andžejs Ļebedevs received and accepted wild cards to compete.

Qualified riders

Calendar

Qualification 
The calendar for qualification consisted of 3 Semi-final events and one SEC Challenge event.

Championship Series 
A four-event calendar was scheduled for the final series, with events in Poland, Germany and Sweden.

Classification

See also 
 2017 Speedway Grand Prix

References

External links 

 

2017
European Championship
Speedway European Championship